Lake Superior College (LSC) is a public community college in Duluth, Minnesota. The college offers pre-baccalaureate majors for students interested in transferring to 4-year educational institutions as well as more than 90 certificate, diploma and degree programs in career and technical fields. LSC's Continuing Education/Customized Training division collaborates with area businesses and industry to design specialized opportunities for entry-level and advanced education. While courses are typically offered in traditional classroom and lab settings, LSC also offers over 150 courses via the internet, through its e-campus.

History 
Lake Superior College was created when the Duluth Technical College and Duluth Community College Center (which was technically the Duluth campus of Hibbing Community College) merged in 1995. At the time, Duluth Community College was housed in a wing of The Marshall School, and Duluth Technical College was housed in LSC's current location. The community college programs were relocated on to the former Technical School campus, when it was expanded in 1996.

Facilities 

Built in 1968, LSC's main campus is located on Trinity Road in Duluth on a  tract that overlooks the western portion of the Duluth/Superior harbor and the Saint Louis River.  The campus features an award-winning hiking trail, a trout stream (Miller Creek) and access to a city-run disc golf course. Facilities have been expanded and upgraded over the years.  For example, in 2007 when the Academic and Student Services building was completed and an area of the campus was renovated to house a Student Life Center.

On March 14, 2010, legislation approving funding for a new Health and Sciences Center addition was signed into law.  The $12 million plus project broke ground June 11, 2010 and a grand opening was held on Friday, January 6, 2012. The building opened for classes on Monday, January 9.

Lake Superior College opened a Duluth Downtown Center in August 2014 to house welding, computer-aided drafting, and machining programs. This move increased the amount of teaching space in these fields from 3,000 square feet to 33,700 square feet and included new equipment for labs.

In September 2016, LSC opened a new Center for Advanced Aviation in Hangar 103 at the Duluth International Airport.  LSC's aviation programs— professional pilot and aviation maintenance technician- are now under one roof. This 40,000-square-foot facility was remodeled to serve FAA teaching requirements.

Accreditation 
Lake Superior College is accredited by the Higher Learning Commission of the North Central Association of Colleges and Schools.

Recognition 
In 2008 and 2009, Lake Superior College was ranked among the nation’s most technically advanced community colleges, according to an annual survey conducted by the Center for Digital Education and Converge magazine, 
LSC was ranked tenth in 2008 and seventh in 2009 among the medium-sized community colleges (3,000 – 7,500 students) in the annual Digital Community Colleges Survey.  The survey identifies and spotlights colleges that provide a high level of service to their students and faculty through information technology.

Leadership 
The president of Lake Superior College is Dr. Patrick M. Johns. He began his assignment on July 1, 2010, succeeding Dr. Kathleen Nelson, who had served as president for 13 years. Johns had previously served as president of Anoka-Ramsey Community College in Coon Rapids and Cambridge, Minnesota.  LSC's first president was Harold Erickson. He served from 1995 to 1997.

Sustainability 
Lake Superior College aligns its triple bottom line sustainability goals through academic planning (economy), strategic planning (society), and facilities planning (environment) and has developed strategies to achieve goals related to each.

A part of the Lake Superior Watershed, Lake Superior College is strongly committed to environmental stewardship and sustainable development.  In 2010, the Academic and Student Services "S" building became the first LEED Certified project in the Minnesota State Colleges and Universities System and continues to build and renovate to at least LEED Silver standards.  LSC regularly monitors energy and water consumption for its 15 buildings and almost 400,000 square feet of space, with a goal of reducing overall carbon emissions by 50% from its 2009 baseline by 2030.  LSC reports its monthly electric, natural gas and water use to the Buildings, Benchmarks and Beyond (B3) public reporting database, where it is benchmarked against peers and tracks its progress toward reduction goals.  In 2017, LSC was awarded a "Best of B3 Benchmarking" statewide award for its year-over-year energy efficiency improvement.

Lake Superior College is a member of the Association for the Advancement of Sustainability in Higher Education (AASHE), is a 2008 signatory of the American Colleges and Universities Presidents' Climate Commitment (ACUPCC), is a 2013 Sustainable Twin Ports Early Adopter, and is a member of the Upper Midwest Association for Campus Sustainability (UMACS).

Governance 
Lake Superior College is a member of the Minnesota State Colleges and Universities System.

Lake Superior College is immune to "Educational Malpractice" lawsuits.

Notes

External links
Official website

Two-year colleges in the United States
Educational institutions established in 1995
Education in Duluth, Minnesota
Universities and colleges in St. Louis County, Minnesota
Community colleges in Minnesota
1995 establishments in Minnesota